Nepenthes aenigma is a tropical pitcher plant known from two mountains in Ilocos Norte province on the Philippine island of Luzon, where it grows at an elevation of around 1200 m above sea level. The species is notable for growing among dense vegetation in deep shade. It shows similarities to N. burkei and N. ventricosa.

The species was originally discovered in April 2002 by ornithologist Herman Nuytemans and was only relocated in the wild just over 10 years later. Prior to its formal description the species was known under the placeholder name "Nepenthes sp. Luzon".

The specific epithet aenigma is Latin for "enigma" or "riddle" and refers to the species's "very unusual ecological preferences" of growing in deep shade.

References

Carnivorous plants of Asia
aenigma
Endemic flora of the Philippines
Flora of Luzon
Plants described in 2016